The 2001-02 International Baseball League of Australia was played exclusively at the Melbourne Ballpark. The championship reverted to its 1999-2000 format using 6 state teams, however New South Wales Country was replaced by an Australian Provincial Team with a mix of players from the Australian Capital Territory and the Northern Territory.

Match results

Game 1: Feb 02, 2002

Game 2: Feb 03, 2002

Game 3: Feb 03, 2002

Game 4: Feb 03, 2002

Game 5: Feb 04, 2002

Game 6: Feb 04, 2002

Game 7: Feb 04, 2002

Game 8: Feb 05, 2002

Game 9: Feb 05, 2002

Game 10: Feb 06, 2002

Game 11: Feb 06, 2002 at Napier Park

Game 12: Feb 06, 2002

Game 13: Feb 07, 2002

Game 14: Feb 07, 2002

Ladder

Championship series

Game 15: Feb 08, 2002 - Playoff 1st v 4th

Game 16: Feb 08, 2002 - Playoff 2nd v 3rd

Game 17: Feb 09, 2002 - Championship Game - Winner Game 15 Vs Winner Game 16
::*Box Score

Awards

Top Stats

All-Star Team

References

International Baseball League of Australia seasons
Baseball